Katherine Devereux Umsted Blake (July 10, 1858 – February 2, 1950) was an American educator, peace activist, women's rights activist, and writer. She served for 34 years as the first principal of PS 6, a.k.a. The Lillie Devereaux Blake School.

Early years and education
Katherine Devereux Umsted Blake was born in New York City, on July 10, 1858. Her parents were Frank Geoffrey Quay Umsted and Lillie Devereux Blake. She was educated at Miss Walker's School, and St. Mary's School. She graduated from the Normal College, 1876. She studied at the School of Pedagogy, New York University, 1887–88.

Career
Blake served as Principal of Public School No. 6, in 1894. She organized the first evening high school for women in New York City, 1897. She served as Chair of the committee of teachers and principals that framed and presented to Mayor William Russell Grace the petition asking for the appointment of women on the Board of Education. She called together the committee of women teachers and principals who made the first effort to secure adequate salaries for city teachers. She spoke in reply to President Franklin D. Roosevelt when he addressed the National Educational Association. She compiled the first statistics showing the number of dark and badly lit rooms in public schools. She was a contributor of verse and prose to periodicals. Blake served as vice-president of the Association of Women Principals of New York City. She was a member of the Special New York City Commission of the National Educational Association, and the Executive Committee of the Normal College Alumnae. She was also a charter member of the Society of Political Study. Blake favored woman suffrage.

Activism
Blake was a peace activist and a suffragist. Among her peace activism activities she served as the New York Chair of the Women's International League for Peace and Freedom. Included in her suffragist activities she marched with hundreds of teachers in the 1915 New York parade sponsored by the Woman Suffrage Association.

Blake died in St. Louis, Missouri on February 2, 1950.

References

Bibliography

External links
 
 
 Katherine Devereux Blake Papers, 1858-1950, Sophia Smith Collection, Smith College.

1858 births
1950 deaths
American suffragists
Nonviolence advocates
Schoolteachers from New York (state)
American women educators
Activists from New York City